Bebenhausen is a village (pop. 347) in the Tübingen district, Baden-Württemberg, Germany. Since 1974 it is a district of the city of Tübingen, its least populous one. It is located 3 km north of Tübingen proper (about 5 km northeast of the city centre), in the southeastern part of the protected landscape of the Schönbuch, a dense forest. Bebenhausen is famous for its monastery, Bebenhausen Abbey, founded in 1183 by Count Palatine Rudolph of Tübingen.

Early 19th century the monastery became a hunting palace for the kings of Württemberg. King William II of Württemberg lived there until his death in 1921, his wife Princess Charlotte of Schaumburg-Lippe until her death in 1946. It became the seat of Württemberg-Hohenzollern from 1947 and until 1952 when Baden-Württemberg was created. In 1974, Bebenhausen became a district of Tübingen.

External links

Official website

Boroughs of Tübingen
Schönbuch